Dave Seglins is a Canadian radio, television and on-line journalist, who has covered domestic and international affairs, policing, government and corporate corruption for many years.  Between 2008 and 2010 he hosted the flagship weekend news program The World This Weekend on CBC Radio One.

More recently, Seglins has been a multi-media investigative journalist with CBC News focused on corruption in policing, government, foreign business, domestic bribery, Canadian mining and construction industries, as well as safety and corruption within Canada's railway sector following the Lac-Mégantic derailment of July 2013 that killed 47 people.

References

Canadian radio news anchors
People from Caledon, Ontario
Living people
Canadian radio reporters and correspondents
CBC Radio hosts
20th-century Canadian journalists
21st-century Canadian journalists
Year of birth missing (living people)